Austrobrillia is a genus of chironomid midges. For many years there was a single described species, A. longipes of Australia, but in 2000 two further South American species were described from pupal exuviae.

Species
A. chilensis Cranston, 2000
A. longipes Freeman, 1961
A. valereissia Cranston, 2000

References

Chironomidae